The Creatures of the Night Tour/10th Anniversary Tour was a concert tour by the hard rock group Kiss in support of their album of the same title. It was the second tour with drummer Eric Carr, his first in the United States, and the first tour with guitarist Vinnie Vincent, (née Vincent Cusano) who replaced Ace Frehley.

Background 
In June 1982, Frehley told Paul Stanley and Gene Simmons that he was leaving Kiss, although it would take 12 months for lawyers to negotiate the lead guitarist's complete departure. In an effort to prolong their lucrative recording contract, Frehley agreed to participate in a press conference on October 22, 1982 and to travel to Europe for a promotional tour in late November. Meanwhile Stanley designed a new persona for Frehley's replacement, Vincent Cusano. Wearing a makeup design of an Egyptian "ankh", Cusano adopted the stage name "Vinnie 'The Wiz' Vincent," who was "even weirder than we are" in the tour's press release. The groups' lucrative record contract with PolyGram required Kiss to be composed of founders Stanley (vocals/rhythm guitar), Simmons (bass/vocals) and Frehley. The release did not say Frehley had quit, but instead stated Frehley was too injured from a recent car crash to tour, but might make appearances onstage when able. The band used group photos containing Ace Frehley for the tour's press kits and ad material during early dates; these were used by promoters for advertising, so many fans did not realize Frehley was replaced until they came to the venues. Before Vincent was announced, new photos were taken and later dates featured the band with Vincent in show ads.

Attendance in North America was abysmal; even though the band had returned to its signature hard rock after a couple of years of pop and disco-influenced music, very few people showed up at the concerts on the tour. Even worse was the fact that the band couldn't drum up interest despite it being their 10th anniversary and their first tour of the US in over three years, an unprecedented amount of time for them during that era. Frontman Paul Stanley recalled a show in Lexington, Kentucky where he threw a guitar pick that went over the entire audience of 2,500 and hit the floor. On March 11, they decided not to book dates beyond April 3, although they accepted a short tour of Brazil in June. Kiss played to the biggest crowd of their career at Maracanã Stadium in Rio de Janeiro, Brazil, with 137,000 people in the audience. According to the band management, promoters were actually interested in booking Kiss in smaller venues such as large nightclubs and smaller theatres where they would have had an easier time selling out shows. The band, however, refused to play anything except arenas and large theatres.

During their North American tour, Kiss was met with accusations from religious groups of promoting Satanism through their music and image, and several protests were held by such groups outside concert venues; however, Kiss politely denied the accusations and the tour continued.

This tour is the only tour to feature live performances of "Rock and Roll Hell" and "Keep Me Comin" from the Creatures of the Night LP, although both would be dropped from the set almost immediately. "I Want You" returned to the setlist for the first time since the Alive II Tour in 1978. The band sang the chant that opened and closed their new main single "I Love It Loud", but by the tour's end, this was changed and only Simmons sang it.

The Plasmatics were the opening act in the middle of the tour while heavy metal band Mötley Crüe opened for Kiss on the final dates of the North American leg after Kiss noticed their notoriety growing. Molly Hatchet, Night Ranger and Zebra were also the opening acts for several concerts on the tour. The Headpins, from Vancouver, BC, opened all four shows in Canada.

In the tour program for the band's final tour, both Simmons and Stanley reflected on the tour:

Stage set 
Simmons described the tour's visual effects: "There's some fire-breathing and blood-spitting into the air and we give birth on stage and there's some fire balls that go thirty feet up into the air. And it rains fire and also some rockets take off on stage, and the stage looks like a tank sixty feet wide. You actually feel it in your chest when the tank moves. And then the drum riser, which is on top of the tank, goes forward, moves left and right, and actually fires like a real tank."

Setlist 
 "Creatures of the Night"
 "Detroit Rock City"
 "Cold Gin"
 "Calling Dr. Love"
 "I Want You" 
 "I Love It Loud"
 "Firehouse"
 "War Machine"
 "Love Gun"
 "God of Thunder"
 "I Still Love You"
 "Shout It Out Loud"
 "Black Diamond"
Encore
 "Strutter"
 "Rock and Roll All Nite"

 "Rock and Roll Hell" was dropped after the first three shows.
 "Keep Me Comin'" was also played live on this tour, but it was dropped after the first two shows.
 "Shout It Out Loud" was dropped from the set list after the February 1 concert in Knoxville, TN.
 "I Love It Loud" was played twice in São Paulo-Brazil (instead of "Strutter").

Tour dates 

First show with Vinnie Vincent.
Paul Stanley announced from the stage they would not be allowed to use pyrotechnics. The show had none, except Simmons' firebreathing. Clips of this show and a quote from Paul Stanley backstage appeared on a Providence, Rhode Island TV station WPRI Channel 12 news story about the Centrum venue beating out the Civic Center for business, using Kiss as one example.
Kiss's last show in makeup until 1996.

Postponed and cancelled dates

Box office score data

Personnel 
 Paul Stanley – vocals, rhythm guitar
 Gene Simmons – vocals, bass
 Eric Carr – drums, vocals
 Vinnie Vincent – lead guitar, backing vocals

References

Sources

Kiss (band) concert tours
1982 concert tours
1983 concert tours